Joy Williams is the self-titled debut album by contemporary Christian music singer Joy Williams, released on August 7, 2001. In an interview after the album's release, Williams said: "Working on my first album, I wanted the music to be indicative of my relationship with Christ and how I was growing." The album featured the hit singles "Serious" and "I Believe In You".

Track listing

Personnel 
 Joy Williams – lead vocals, backing vocals (1, 2, 4-8)
 Dennis Patton – programming (1, 7, 8, 9), arrangements (1, 7, 8, 9)
 Dan Muckala – tracks (2-6)
 Tom Howard – acoustic piano (10)
 Tim Pierce – acoustic guitar (1, 8, 9), electric guitars (1, 8, 9), nylon guitar (7)
 Alex Nifong – guitars (2, 6)
 Chris Graffagnio – guitars (3, 4, 5)
 Stephen Leiwerke – guitars (4)
 David Cleveland – electric guitars (7)
 Mark Hill – bass (7)
 Ken Lewis – percussion (1, 7, 8, 9)
 Kari Kimmel – backing vocals (3)
 Peter Penrose – backing vocals (3)
 Crossfire Choir (Marion, Illinois) – choir (9)
 Chris Partain – choir director and arrangements (9)

Production 
 Dennis Patton – producer (1, 7, 8, 9), additional engineer (1, 7, 8, 9)
 Dan Muckala – producer (2-6)
 George King – producer (10), executive producer 
 Dean Diehl – executive producer
 Dan Mann – executive producer
 Richie Biggs – engineer (1, 7, 8, 9), mixing (1, 7, 8, 9)
 Steve Lotz – engineer (2-6), Pro Tools editing (2-6)
 Bill Deaton – additional engineer (1, 7, 8, 9)
 Lynn Fuston – additional engineer (1, 7, 8, 9), engineer (10), mixing (10)
 Dan Shike – assistant engineer (2-6)
 F. Reid Shippen – mixing (2, 4, 5, 6)
 Tom Laune – mixing (3)
 Jason McArthur – A&R coordinator 
 Stephanie McBrayer – production coordinator, stylist 
 Scott Hughes – art direction, design 
 Tim Parker – art direction, design
 Tony Baker – photography
 Chad Dickerson – stylist
 Katinka – hair, make-up
 MANN Associates – management 

Studios
 Recorded at Smokehouse Studio (Franklin, Tennessee); Glorified Mono Studio, Quad Studios and Sidekick Sound Studios  (Nashville, Tennessee); Future Music (San Jose, California).
 Mixed at Recording Arts, Quad Studios, Vital Recordings and Bridgeway Studios (Nashville, Tennessee).

References 

2001 debut albums
Joy Williams (singer) albums
Reunion Records albums